Kalvskinnet is a neighborhood in the city of Trondheim in Trøndelag county, Norway. It is situated southwest of the city centre in the borough of Midtbyen, bordering the river Nidelva in the south.  The area is dominated by public offices, including such institutions as the Norwegian University of Science and Technology, Sør-Trøndelag University College, and Trondheim Science Museum. There is also some quite expensive housing located in this area, characterized by buildings from the last century.

The present name first occurs in 1556. In Sverris saga, the location was called akeren. In 1179, Kalvskinnet was the site of the Battle of Kalvskinnet (Slaget på Kalvskinnet) between King Sverre Sigurdsson and Erling Skakke.

References

External links
NTNU Kalvskinnet

Geography of Trondheim
Neighbourhoods of Trondheim